Yoshivia is a religious moshav in southern Israel. Located near Netivot, it falls under the jurisdiction of Sdot Negev Regional Council.

History
The village was established in 1950 by immigrants from Algeria on land which had previously belonged to the abandoned Arab village of al-Muharraqa. It was named after Yoel Ben Yoshivia, a member of the Tribe of Simeon which lived in the area and mentioned in 1 Chronicles 4:35;
and Joel, and Jehu the son of Joshibiah, the son of Seraiah, the son of Asiel;

References

External links
Yoshivia Negev Information Centre

Algerian-Jewish culture in Israel
Moshavim
Religious Israeli communities
Populated places established in 1950
Populated places in Southern District (Israel)
1950 establishments in Israel